John Kaye (27 December 1783, Hammersmith – 18 February 1853, Riseholme, Lincolnshire) was a British churchman.

Early life and education
He was born the only son of Abraham Kaye in Hammersmith, London and educated at the school of Sir Charles Burney in Hammersmith and then Greenwich. He entered Christ's College, Cambridge and graduated Senior wrangler in 1804. He was the 21st Master of Christ's College from 1814 to 1830. Vice-Chancellor of Cambridge University in 1814,

In 1816, Kaye was elected Regius Professor of Divinity and he revived public lectures on theology, with an focus on the study of ecclesiastical history and the Early Church Fathers. His first series of lectures, The Ecclesiastical History of the Second and Third Centuries, illustrated from the Writings of Tertullian was published at Cambridge in 1825, and was followed by published lectures on Justin Martyr (1829), Clement of Alexandria (1835) and The Council of Nicæa in connection with the Life of Athanasius (posthumously, 1853).

He was elected Fellow of the Royal Society in 1811.

Ecclesiastical career

Kaye was appointed Bishop of Bristol in 1820, and remained there until his translation in 1827 to Lincoln. Kaye served as Bishop of Lincoln for 26 years until his death in 1853. During his incumbency at Lincoln, he instigated widespread improvements to church buildings and parsonages and established new Church of England schools.

As Bishop of Lincoln, Kaye resided at Buckden Palace in Buckden Huntingdonshire. In 1837, the county was transferred to the Diocese of Ely and Kaye's official residence was transferred to Riseholme Hall, the newly established episcopal palace at Riseholme in Lincolnshire.

In 1848, Kaye was elected Visitor of Balliol College, Oxford.

At a time when the Oxford Movement sought to revive some older Catholic traditions within the Church of England, Kaye's theological inclinations leaned instead towards Evangelicalism, and he regarded the High Church movement with suspicion.  He was opposed to the revival of the Convocations of Canterbury and York and was sympathetic to George Cornelius Gorham's views on baptism.

He reformed the educational requirements for the Anglican clergy and attacked the Tractarians for betraying the English Reformation.

Personal life
While at Christ's College, Cambridge, Kaye married Eliza Mortlock in 1815. They had three daughters and one son, William Frederic John Kaye, who was later ordained to the priesthood and was appointed Archdeacon of Lincoln in 1863 by his father's successor, Bishop John Jackson.

Death and memorials
Bishop Kaye is buried in the churchyard of St Mary's Church in Riseholme, Lincolnshire, a church that he himself had built during his reforms of the See of Lincoln. Within Lincoln Cathedral, Kaye is commemorated by a recumbent effigy tomb monument designed by Richard Westmacott.
The memorial originally stood in St Hugh's transept, but was moved to the southern chapel.

References

 E. A. Varley, ‘Kaye, John (1783–1853)’, Oxford Dictionary of National Biography, Oxford University Press, 2004

1783 births
1853 deaths
People from Hammersmith
Alumni of Christ's College, Cambridge
Masters of Christ's College, Cambridge
Vice-Chancellors of the University of Cambridge
Bishops of Lincoln
Bishops of Bristol
19th-century Church of England bishops
Senior Wranglers
Fellows of the Royal Society
Regius Professors of Divinity (University of Cambridge)